Liga 3 Aceh is a third level Indonesian Football competition held by Asprov PSSI Aceh since 2017. 
It is also a qualification to qualify for the Liga 3 National round.

Kuala Nanggroe, Persidi, and PSBL became the most successful teams (1 title each).

Championship history

References 

Liga 3 (Indonesia) seasons
Sport in Aceh

External links